Zerrin Bakır (born 27 June 1981) is a Turkish football coach, and  former football player in the top Turkish women's football leagues.  She was a member of the Tyrkey women's national U-19 and A teams. She works as a school teacher.

Private life 
Zerrin Bakır was born in Çamakkale on 27 June 1981. She works as a school teacher.

Club career 
Bakır started her football career at her hometown club Çanakkale Belediyespor (1998-1999). She then played for Gemlik Zeytinspor (1999-2000),	Kuzeyspor (2000-2001), and Maltepe Yalıspor (2001-2002) in the Women's League, Marmara Üniversitesispor (208-2009) in the Women's Second League as well as Kartalspor (2009-2010) and again Marmara Üniversitesispor (2010-2011) in the Women's First League. She scored ten goals in a total of 31 league matches.

International career 
In 1999, she became member of the Turkey girls' U-19 team, and appeared in two matches of the 2000 UEFA Women's Under-19 Championship qualifying First round and in three matches of the Second round.

She was admitted to the Turkey women's national team and debuted in the friendly match against Israel on 1 July 1999. She played at three matches of the UEFA Women's Euro 2001 qualifying and six matches of the 2003 FIFA Women's World Cup qualification (UEFA). She scored two goals in a total of 16 international matches.

Manager career 
Bakır started a manager career after obtaining a UEFA A Coaching Licence. In 2014, she was appointed head coach of the newly established girls football club Öz Yavuzselimspor in Esenler district of Istanbul. ın 2015, Her team competed in the Turkish Girls' U-15 Regional Championship's Group Istanbul. The team took part in the Girls' U-17 Turkey Championship in 2016.

References 

1981 births
Living people
Sportspeople from Çanakkale
Turkish women's footballers
Turkish women's football managers
Turkish female association football managers
Turkish sportswomen
Marmara Üniversitesi Spor players
Turkish schoolteachers
Women's association footballers not categorized by position